Ron Parker (born August 17, 1987) is a former American football free safety.  He was signed by the Seattle Seahawks as an undrafted free agent in 2011. He had also played for the Oakland Raiders, the Carolina Panthers, had a brief stint with the Atlanta Falcons, and most notably played for the Kansas City Chiefs for six seasons (2013-18). He played college football for Newberry College.

Early years
Parker's father, Ronzo, was a truck driver and his mother Rose worked at a Montessori public school. Parker has a twin name Don and he has an older sister Ronique. Parker was raised near Beaufort, South Carolina.  Attended Beaufort High School, Lady's Island Middle and St Helena Elementary.

College career
Parker played for the Newberry College Wolves in the South Atlantic Conference in NCAA Division II. In 2009, Parker was selected to the first team All-American by Don Hansen's Football Gazette and to the second team All-American by D2Football.com and Daktronics. Parker also was selected to the first team all-Super Region selection by Daktronics and also was named to the all-South Atlantic Conference first team. Parker was selected to the first team All-American by D2Football.com and Don Hansen's Football Gazette. Parker was selected to the second team All-American by Daktronics and a third team Little All-American by the Associated Press following his senior season.

Professional career

Seattle Seahawks (first stint)

2011
Parker went undrafted in the 2011 NFL Draft. On July 26, 2011, the Seattle Seahawks signed Parker to a three-year, $1.39 million contract that includes a signing bonus of $1,000 as an undrafted free agent. He was released on August 31, 2011 and was signed to the practice squad on September 5. On September 22, 2011, the Seattle Seahawks released Parker.

Oakland Raiders
On September 26, 2011, the Oakland Raiders signed Parker to their practice squad. On October 1, 2011, he was promoted to the Raiders' active roster. On October 2, 2011, Parker made his professional regular season debut during a 31–19 loss to the New England Patriots in Week 4. On October 22, 2011, the Oakland Raiders released Parker.

Seattle Seahawks (second stint)
On October 24, 2011, the Seattle Seahawks claimed Parker off of waivers. Head coach Pete Carroll named Parker the sixth cornerback on the depth chart, behind Richard Sherman, Brandon Browner, Byron Maxwell, Roy Lewis, and Kennard Cox. Parker appeared in five games as a rookie in 2011, but was unable to record a statistic.

2012
Throughout training camp, Parker competed for a roster spot as a backup cornerback against Roy Lewis, Phillip Adams, Jeremy Lane, and Coye Francies. On August 26, 2012, the Seattle Seahawks waived Parker.

Carolina Panthers
On September 2, 2012, the Carolina Panthers signed Parker to their practice squad. On October 6, 2012, the Carolina Panthers promoted Parker to their active roster. On October 7, 2012, Parker recorded his first career tackle during a 16–12 loss to the Seattle Seahawks in Week 5. The following day, the Carolina Panthers released Parker, but re-signed him to their practice squad two days later. On October 17, 2012, the Carolina Panthers promoted Parker to the active roster then later released and signed to the practice squad on November 7, 2012.

Seattle Seahawks (third stint)
On December 5, 2012, Parker was signed by the Seahawks off the Panthers' practice squad. On December 16, 2012,  
Parker collected a season-high two solo tackles in the Seahawks' 50–17 victory at the Buffalo Bills in Week 15. On December 28, 2012, the Seattle Seahawks released Parker, but signed him to their practice squad three days later. Parker finished the 2012 NFL season with three solo tackles in five games and zero starts.

2013
On January 15, 2013, the Seattle Seahawks signed Parker to a two-year, $1.20 million contract.

Throughout training camp, Parker competed for a roster spot as a backup cornerback against DeShawn Shead, Will Blackmon, Byron Maxwell, Tharold Simon, and Walter Thurmond. On August 13, 2013, the Seattle Seahawks released Parker.

Kansas City Chiefs (first stint)
On September 1, 2013, the Kansas City Chiefs claimed Parker off of waivers. Head coach Andy Reid named Parker the fifth cornerback on the depth chart to start the regular season, behind Sean Smith, Brandon Flowers, Dunta Robinson, and Marcus Cooper.

On September 15, 2013, Parker recorded one tackle and made his first career sack on Cowboys' quarterback Tony Romo during the Chiefs' 17–16 win against the Dallas Cowboys in Week 2. On December 15, 2013, Parker broke up a pass and made his first career interception in the Chiefs' 56–31 victory at the Oakland Raiders in Week 15. Parker made his first career interception off a pass attempt by Raiders' quarterback Terrelle Pryor, that was originally intended for tight end Nick Kasa, and returned it for a 15-yard gain in the fourth quarter. In Week 17,  Parker earned his first career start and collected a season-high six solo tackles, broke up two passes, and intercepted a pass by Philip Rivers during a 27–24 loss at the San Diego Chargers. He finished the 2013 NFL season with 17 solo tackles, three pass deflections, two interceptions, and one sack in 16 games and one start.

The Kansas City Chiefs finished the 2013 NFL season second in the AFC West with an 11–5 record and earned a wildcard berth. On January 4, 2014, Parker appeared in his first career playoff game and made one solo tackle in their 45–44 loss at the Indianapolis Colts in the AFC Wildcard Game.

2014
Throughout training camp, Parker competed to be a starting cornerback against Sean Smith, Marcus Cooper, and Phillip Gaines. Head coach Andy Reid named Parker a starting cornerback to start the regular season in 2014. He started alongside Marcus Cooper and safeties Eric Berry and Husain Abdullah.

He started in the Kansas City Chiefs' season-opener against the Tennessee Titans and recorded six solo tackles and broke up a pass in their 26-10 loss. Parker started at strong safety in place of Eric Berry who was inactive for five games (Weeks 3-8) with an ankle injury. On October 26, 2014, Parker made four solo tackles, a pass deflection, a sack, and intercepted a pass during a 34-7 victory against the St. Louis Rams in Week 8. In Week 11, he collected a season-high 11 solo tackles in the Chiefs' 24-20 win against the Seattle Seahawks. Parker was moved to strong safety for the last five games of the regular season after Eric Berry was diagnosed with Hodgkin's lymphoma. He finished the 2014 NFL season with a career-high 94 combined tackles (81 solo), 12 pass deflections, one interception, one sack, and a forced fumble in 16 games and 15 starts.

2015
Parker became an unrestricted free agent in 2015 and received interest from multiple teams, including the Tampa Bay Buccaneers, Atlanta Falcons, New York Giants, and New York Jets. On March 16, 2015, the Kansas City Chiefs signed Parker to a five-year, $30 million contract that included $8 million guaranteed and a signing bonus of $5 million.

Parker entered training camp slated as the starting strong safety. Head coach Andy Reid named him the starter to begin the regular season, alongside free safety Husain Abdullah.

In Week 4, he collected a season-high eight combined tackles in the Chiefs' 36-21 loss at the Kansas City Chiefs. On November 1, 2015, Parker recorded four solo tackles and made a season-high two sacks on Lions' quarterback Matthew Stafford during a 45-10 win against the Detroit Lions in Week 8. He amassed a total of five sacks in 2015, setting a Chiefs single-season sack record for defensive backs. He finished the season with 78 tackles, 12 passes defensed, a forced fumble, and three interceptions.

Parker set a franchise record for most career sacks by a defensive back in Week 17 of the 2015 season, when he sacked Oakland Raiders quarterback Derek Carr.

2016 
Parker started all 16 games for the Chiefs at safety again in 2016, recording 61 tackles, 59 passes defense

2017 
In 2017, Parker once again started all 16 games for Kansas City. He made 67 tackles and recorded two interceptions. He also recovered two fumbles.

2018
On March 12, 2018, Parker was released by the Chiefs after five seasons.

Atlanta Falcons
On June 25, 2018, Parker signed with the Atlanta Falcons. He was released on August 31, 2018.

Kansas City Chiefs (second stint)
Parker signed with the Kansas City Chiefs on September 2, 2018, just a few days after the Falcons released him. He played in 15 games with 14 starts, finishing third on the team with 77 tackles, along with five passes defensed, and two interceptions. On October 21, Parker scored his first NFL touchdown after intercepting a pass from Cincinnati Bengals quarterback Andy Dalton and returning it for a touchdown. On January 15, 2019, Parker was released by the Chiefs.

Retirement
Parker announced his retirement on January 6, 2020.

References

External links
Newberry Wolves bio
Kansas City Chiefs bio

1987 births
Living people
People from Saint Helena Island, South Carolina
Players of American football from South Carolina
American football cornerbacks
American football safeties
Independence Pirates football players
Newberry Wolves football players
Seattle Seahawks players
Oakland Raiders players
Carolina Panthers players
Kansas City Chiefs players
Atlanta Falcons players